Clauzetto is a comune (municipality) in the Province of Pordenone in the Italian region Friuli-Venezia Giulia, located about  northwest of Trieste and about  northeast of Pordenone.

Clauzetto borders the following municipalities: Castelnovo del Friuli, Pinzano al Tagliamento, Tramonti di Sotto, Vito d'Asio.

References

Cities and towns in Friuli-Venezia Giulia